Sir Ronald Ramsay Trotter (9 October 1927 – 11 August 2010) was one of New Zealand's pre-eminent business leaders.  He was knighted for his service to business in 1985.

Early life and family
Born in Hāwera on 9 October 1927, Trotter was the son of Annie Euphemia Trotter (née Young) and Clement George Trotter. He was educated at Wanganui Collegiate School, and went on to study at Victoria University College from 1945 to 1947, graduating Bachelor of Commerce, followed by a year at Canterbury Agricultural College where he completed a Certificate of Agriculture.

In 1955, Trotter married Margaret Patricia Rainey, and the couple went on to have four children.

Business career
Trotter was instrumental in the formation of Fletcher Challenge Corporation in 1981, where he was the chief executive and chairman.

Directorships and management roles
managing director and Chairman of Wright Stephenson and Co (1958–72)
Chairman and managing director Challenge Corporation (1970–1981)
Chairman and Chief Executive of Fletcher Challenge (1981–87)
Chairman Fletcher Challenge (1987–90)
Trustee and Chairman of the New Zealand Institute of Economic Research (1973–86)
Chairman of Telecom Corporation of New Zealand
Director of Air New Zealand (1989–93)
Director and Chairman of Toyota New Zealand (1964–2001)
Inaugural Chairman of the New Zealand Business Roundtable (1985–1990)

Public sector roles
Trotter made substantial contributions to the public sector.  His roles included:
Chairman of the Steering Committee of the New Zealand Economic Summit Conference of 1984
Director of the Reserve Bank of New Zealand
Chairman of the State-owned Enterprises Advisory Committee (1987–88)
Chairman of the Museum of New Zealand Te Papa Tongarewa
Chairman of Post Office Bank (1989)
Member and Chairman of the Oversees Investment Commission (1974–77)
Chairman of the Interim Provider Board

Honours
In the 1985 Queen's Birthday Honours, Trotter was appointed a Knight Bachelor, for services to business management. In 1999, he was inducted into the New Zealand Business Hall of Fame.

Other activities
Trotter was also an art collector and, along with his wife Margaret, Lady Trotter, played an instrumental role in the formation of the Fletcher Challenge Art Collection.

References

1927 births
2010 deaths
Lincoln University (New Zealand) alumni
New Zealand businesspeople
People from Hāwera
Deaths from cancer in New Zealand
New Zealand Knights Bachelor
Businesspeople awarded knighthoods
People associated with the Museum of New Zealand Te Papa Tongarewa
People educated at Whanganui Collegiate School
Victoria University of Wellington alumni